Illauneeragh (Gaeilge:An tOileán Iarthach) is an island in County Galway, Ireland.

See also
Illauneeragh West

References

Islands of County Galway

Uninhabited islands of Ireland